Air Mali operated internationally scheduled passenger flights to the following (as of December 2012):

Air Mali also operates domestic flights in their country.

References

Lists of airline destinations